Rahdar (also Romanized as Rāhdār and Rāh-i-Dar; also known as Rūḩdār) is a village in Shahid Modarres Rural District, in the Central District of Shushtar County, Khuzestan Province, Iran. At the 2006 census, its population was 74, in 22 families.

References 

Populated places in Shushtar County